Premiere is a 1938 British musical mystery film directed by Walter Summers and starring John Lodge, Judy Kelly, Joan Marion, Hugh Williams. In Paris a leading theatre impresario is murdered on opening night, shortly after replacing his leading lady. A police Inspector in the audience takes over the investigation.

The film was shot at Elstree Studios. It was a close remake of the 1937 Austrian film Premiere and re-used a number of musical scenes from the original which were dubbed into English.

Cast
 John Lodge as Inspector Bonnard
 Judy Kelly as Carmen Daviot
 Joan Marion as Lydia Lavalle
 Hugh Williams as Nissen, Rene
 Edward Chapman as Lohrmann
 Steven Geray as Frolich
 Edmund Breon as Morel
 Wallace Geoffrey as Renoir
 Geoffrey Sumner as Captain Curry
 Joss Ambler as Spectator
 Jack Lambert as Stage manager

References

Bibliography
 Wood, Linda. British Films 1927-1939. British Film Institute, 1986.

External links
 

1938 films
1938 mystery films
1938 musical films
British musical films
British mystery films
Films shot at Associated British Studios
1930s English-language films
Films directed by Walter Summers
Remakes of Austrian films
Films set in Paris
British black-and-white films
1930s British films